Allonemobius maculatus, known generally as the spotted ground cricket or larger spotted ground cricket, is a species of ground cricket in the family Gryllidae.  It is found in North America.

References

Further reading

 
 

Ensifera
Insects described in 1900